Hakihokake Creek (also known as Quequacommissacong Creek or Milford Creek) is a  tributary of the Delaware River in Hunterdon County, New Jersey in the United States.

The Hakihokake's headwaters begins in the Musconetcong Mountains in forested wetlands in Holland and Alexandria townships and runs southwest through Sweet Hollow and Little York before joining the Delaware River just upstream of its sister tributary Harihokake Creek at Milford.

See also
List of rivers of New Jersey

References

External links
 U.S. Geological Survey: NJ stream gaging stations
 Mill Street Bridge - Milford, NJ

Tributaries of the Delaware River
Rivers of Hunterdon County, New Jersey
Rivers of New Jersey